Raritan is a literary and intellectual quarterly that publishes poetry, fiction and essays. The journal is based at Rutgers University in New Jersey. The magazine was founded by Richard Poirier in 1981 and is currently edited by Jackson Lears. Lears began to edit it in 2002.

Notable writers who have contributed to this journal include Jacob M. Appel,  Harold Bloom, David Bromwich, Anne Carson, Robert Coles, William C. Dowling, David Ferry, Harry Frankfurt, George Kateb, Frank Kermode, Joyce Carol Oates, Adam Phillips, Robert Pinsky, Richard Posner, Richard Rorty, Edward Said, Frederick Seidel, Vikram Seth, Daniel Stern, and Michael Wood.

See also
List of literary magazines

References

External links
Website of the Raritan Quarterly Review

Poetry magazines published in the United States
Quarterly magazines published in the United States
Magazines established in 1981
Rutgers University publications
Magazines published in New Jersey